Castellanos de Moriscos is a village and municipality in the province of Salamanca,  western Spain, part of the autonomous community of Castile-Leon.

The postal code is 37439.

References

Municipalities in the Province of Salamanca